Frederick Boylstein (March 15, 1902 – February 28, 1972) was a lightweight professional boxer from the United States, who competed in the 1920s. He won a bronze medal at the 1924 Summer Olympics in the lightweight division, losing against Alfredo Copello in the semi-finals.

Pro career
Boylstein turned pro in 1925 and retired in 1930, having won 8, lost, and drawn 1.

References

External links
 
 
 Social Security Death Index

1902 births
1972 deaths
Boxers from Pennsylvania
Lightweight boxers
Olympic bronze medalists for the United States in boxing
Boxers at the 1924 Summer Olympics
Place of birth missing
American male boxers
Medalists at the 1924 Summer Olympics